This is a list of laptops manufactured by LG Electronics.

Background
Early examples of LG laptops were netbooks: X110, X120 and X130 from 2009.

Xnote 
Xnote was a notebook computer series made by LG Electronics Ltd, originally being part of an LG and IBM joint venture. After severing ties in 2005, LG still produced the Xnote series till 2013, when LG discontinued the netbook/laptop lineup.

There are several models offered, with varied LCD sizes.

N450 
2012

N550 
2012

Z330 
Released in 2012

P330 
Unveiled in November 2011, the P330 came with 2nd generation Intel Core i5 or i7 processors, Nvidia GeForce 555M graphics card and had a 13.3”, 1366 x 768 (16:9), 120.55 ppi LED Back-Light display.

A510 
Released in 2010

U560 
Released in 2013

Z1 series 
Z1-2007 released in 2007

Express dual series

Express dual series was released in 2005.

P1 express dual 
The LG p1 express dual contained an Intel Core Duo Processor T2500 and 512MB of ram pre installed. It came with Windows XP. The screen was an LCD 15.7” display. It was released for AUD$2900.

S1 express dual 
The LG S1 express dual was  cost circa AUD$3999. It had a 15.7” display.

M1 express dual 
The LG M1 express dual had around a 15” display. It was cheaper than the P1 express dual.

T1 express dual 
The T1 Express dual had a 14.7” display. It was the cheapest laptop in the LG Express dual series v1.0.

LT20 series
Semi-rugged netvertible

E-book 
LG E-Book is a proof of concept design for a new series of laptops being developed by LG Electronics of South Korea. Two prototypes have been built so far, but a release date was never announced. The laptop uses an organic light-emitting diode screen instead of the traditional LCD. The laptop is powered by a methyl alcohol solution instead of the more conventional Li-ion batteries seen in laptops today.

Gram 

The LG Gram is a lineup of laptop computers weighing around 1 kg manufactured by LG electronics.

The Gram was announced in September 2015 with two screen sizes available: 13.3" and 14". A 15.6" model was introduced during CES 2016. During CES 2017, the 2017 edition of the Gram was introduced. During CES 2018, the 2018 edition of the Gram was introduced. During CES 2019, a larger 17" Gram alongside a 14" 2-in-1 Gram was introduced. Gram's marketing is held with the light weight of it. As the weight 980 gram is the maximum weight that it could have in all condition, LG was famous for its modest marketing in Korea. During CES 2021, a larger 16" Gram alongside a 16" 2-in-1 Gram was introduced.

Specifications

References 

 
LG laptops